Nopo may refer to:

People
 Casto Nopo

Places
 , Mozambique
 Nopo station, South Korea
 North Potomac, Maryland, United States

Other
 Counter-terrorism Special Force
 Nopo or anadenanthera peregrina